17 is the twelfth studio album by Japanese band Tokio. It was released on August 22, 2012. The album peaked at fifth place on the Oricon weekly charts, and remained in the charts for five weeks.

It was the band's final studio album feature bassist Tatsuya Yamaguchi.

Track listing

References 

2012 albums
Tokio (band) albums
Japanese-language albums